Akhtaruddin Ahmad was a Member of the 3rd National Assembly of Pakistan as a representative of East Pakistan.

Career
Ahmad was a Member of the 3rd National Assembly of Pakistan representing Bakerganj-IV.

References

Pakistani MNAs 1962–1965
Living people
Year of birth missing (living people)